The 2021–22 Bangabandhu National Football Championship is the 7th edition of the National Football Championship, the premier competition in Bangladesh for teams representing districts and government institutions. It is organized and hosted by the Bangladesh Football Federation. A total of 78 participants nation-wide will participate in the tournament. The format of the tournament changed in this edition as it is no more a top division league and resuming after 13 years.

Bangladesh Army were the defending champions before the competition began.

Participants teams
There are 64 participants teams were divided into eight zones.

Format
Along with 64 districts football teams three service teams, six public universities, five education boards, and Bangladesh Krira Shikkha Protishthan will participate in the tournament. The participants districts have been divided in eight zones named Padma, Meghna, Jamuna, Shitalakshya, Brahmaputra, Surma, Chitra and Buriganga. Each zone consists eight teams except Surma, which contains seven teams. There will be knockout matches in every zone which will be played on home and away basis. In first round, a pair of teams of every zone will play each other which will decide four winners. In second round, that four winners in each zone will play zonal semifinal. In third round, the semi-final winners will face each other in zonal final. The champion from each zone will qualify for the final round.

Teams representing education boards, universities & the services teams—a total of 15 teams—are divided in four groups in Sheba zone. The teams of this zone will play on round-robin basis. Champion and runners-up of Sheba zone will join eight zonal champions in the final round.

Championship round
In the championship round ten teams will contest: the eight winner teams from eight zones.

Qualified teams

Statistics

Goalscorers

References

1